The 1975 Dartmouth Big Green football team was an American football team that represented Dartmouth College during the 1975 NCAA Division I football season. Dartmouth finished fourth in the Ivy League.

In their third season under head coach Jake Crouthamel, the Big Green compiled a 5–3–1 record and outscored opponents 160 to 121. Thomas Parnon and Reginald Williams were the team captains.

The Big Green's 4–2–1 conference record placed fourth in the Ivy League. Dartmouth outscored Ivy opponents 129 to 107.

Dartmouth played its home games at Memorial Field on the college campus in Hanover, New Hampshire.

Schedule

References

Dartmouth
Dartmouth Big Green football seasons
Dartmouth Big Green football